Doriella is a genus of bristle flies in the family Tachinidae.

Species
Doriella distincta (Wiedemann, 1824)

Distribution
West Indies.

References

Exoristinae
Tachinidae genera
Diptera of North America
Monotypic Brachycera genera
Taxa named by Charles Henry Tyler Townsend